Musandam may refer to:
 Musandam Governorate, the Omani part of the Musandam Peninsula
 Musandam Peninsula